Ji Xiaoxuan (born 19 March 1993) is a Chinese professional footballer who plays as a winger.

Club career
Ji was born in Xianju. He started his professional football career in 2011 when he was loaned to Shanghai Zobon's squad for the 2011 China League Two campaign. He joined Chinese Super League's newcomer Shanghai Dongya in 2013. On 21 May 2013, he made his debut for Shanghai Dongya in the third round of 2013 Chinese FA Cup which Shanghai Dongya played against Chongqing Lifan. Ji scored his penalty in the penalty shootout and Shanghai eventually beat Chongqing 6–5 and advanced to the next round.

On 2 July 2014, Ji transferred to Chinese Super League side Harbin Yiteng. He won the title of 2018 China League One most valuable player.

In January 2019, Ji moved abroad and joined French side Auxerre.

Career statistics
.

References

External links
 

1993 births
Living people
Chinese footballers
People from Taizhou, Zhejiang
Footballers from Zhejiang
Pudong Zobon players
Shanghai Port F.C. players
Zhejiang Yiteng F.C. players
AJ Auxerre players
Qingdao F.C. players
Association football wingers
China League Two players
Chinese Super League players
China League One players
Championnat National 3 players
Ligue 2 players
Chinese expatriate footballers
Expatriate footballers in France
Chinese expatriate sportspeople in France